Brookdale is a ghost town in Rush County, Kansas, United States.

History
Brookdale was issued a post office in 1875. The post office was discontinued in 1888.

References

Further reading

External links
 Rush County maps: Current, Historic, KDOT

Former populated places in Rush County, Kansas
Former populated places in Kansas